The 2019 Grand National (officially known as the Randox Health Grand National for sponsorship reasons) was the 172nd annual running of the Grand National horse race at Aintree Racecourse near Liverpool, England. The showpiece steeplechase was held on 6 April and is the pinnacle of a three-day festival.

The event was sponsored by Randox Health as part of an agreement signed in 2016 for the company to sponsor the race for five years starting in 2017.

The race was won by 4/1 favourite Tiger Roll, ridden by Davy Russell and trained by Gordon Elliott. Tiger Roll became the first horse since Red Rum in 1974 to win back-to-back Nationals, as well as the first favorite to win the race since Comply or Die in 2008.		
19 of the 40 horses that started managed to complete the course.

In the race, Up For Review sustained a neck fracture after being brought down at the first fence. He was the first equine fatality in the race since 2012, after which the fences were drastically altered and softened.

Race card 
112 entries were received, including 47 from Ireland. The final line-up of 40 horses was announced on 4 April 2019. Mall Dini was withdrawn the following day due to injury and replaced by Just A Par. No further withdrawals meant that a full field of 40 horses were sent to the start line.

Gordon Elliott broke the record for the most horses trained in a single running of the race, entering 11 horses. Elliott had also been the initial trainer for both Outlander and Don Poli, though these horses were sold prior to the race and passed on to new trainers.

Finishing order

Non-finishers

Broadcasting and media 

As the Grand National is accorded the status of an event of national interest in the United Kingdom and is listed on the Ofcom Code on Sports and Other Listed and Designated Events, it must be shown on free-to-air terrestrial television in the UK. The race was broadcast live on TV by ITV, in the third year of its four-year deal as the exclusive terrestrial broadcaster of horse racing in the UK.

The coverage was co-anchored by Ed Chamberlin and Francesca Cumani. Analysis was provided by former Grand National winning jockeys Sir Anthony McCoy and Mick Fitzgerald, along with leading female jockey Bryony Frost, who had been ruled out of competing through injury, and veteran racing broadcaster Brough Scott. Reports were provided by Oli Bell, Alice Plunkett, Rishi Persad and Luke Harvey with updates from the betting ring by Brian Gleeson and Matt Chapman and Chris Hughes covering viewers comments on social media. The commentary team was Mark Johnson, Ian Bartlett and Richard Hoiles. Following the race, Bell, Fitzgerald and Chapman guided viewers on a fence-by-fence re-run of the race - due to the fatal injury sustained to Up For Review, the first fence was omitted from the re-run broadcast.

See also
Horse racing in Great Britain
List of British National Hunt races

References

External links
Grand National Official Website
Grand National Beginner's Guide

2019
Grand National
Grand National
21st century in Merseyside
Grand National
Grand